Curbridge is a village and civil parish immediately southwest of Witney, in the West Oxfordshire district, in the county of Oxfordshire, England. The 2011 Census recorded the parish's population as 529. Since 2012 it has been part of the Curbridge and Lew joint parish council area, sharing a parish council with the adjacent civil parish of Lew.

Romano-British settlement
When the Witney Bypass was being built in the 1970s, the remains of a Romano-British settlement were found a short distance northeast of Manor Farm. Foundations were found of rectangular timber-framed buildings, some with limestone rubble foundations.  A cemetery was found, containing 18 burials. There may have been more, but if so they are now beneath the bypass. Most of the bodies lay with their heads pointing east or north. Three of the adults had been beheaded, and were laid with their heads between their legs. This was a burial practice in the late Roman and early Anglo-Saxon eras. It is not known whether beheading was the cause of death or was done posthumously. 

In a later phase of settlement, a midden covered the cemetery.  Artefacts found included a whetstone made from local limestone, a copper alloy brooch, a copper finger ring, a bronze Roman coin from the reign of the Roman usurper Magnentius (AD 350–353), fragments of Romano-British pottery, and clusters of hobnails showing where leather footwear had rotted away in the ground.

History
It is a Grade II* listed building. In the mid-1970s the Witney Bypass was built to allow the A40 trunk road to pass south of Witney. The bypass was made the new civil parish boundary, and that part of the parish north of it was transferred to Witney.

Parish church
A Church of England chapel was built in Curbridge in 1838 and the Gothic Revival architect CC Rolfe added an apse in 1874. In 1906 the chapel was demolished and replaced with the present Church of England parish church of Saint John the Baptist. Its parish is part of the Benefice of Witney, which also includes Hailey.

References

Sources and further reading

External links

Curbridge Village Website

Villages in Oxfordshire
Civil parishes in Oxfordshire
West Oxfordshire District